Chinook Jargon ( or , also known simply as Chinook or Jargon) is a  language originating as a pidgin trade language in the Pacific Northwest. It spread during the 19th century from the lower Columbia River, first to other areas in modern Oregon and Washington, then British Columbia and parts of Alaska, Northern California, Idaho and Montana while sometimes taking on characteristics of a creole language. It is partly descended from the Chinook language, upon which much of its vocabulary is based. Approximately 15 percent of its lexicon is French, and it also makes use of English loanwords and those of other language systems. Its entire written form is in the Duployan shorthand developed by French priest Émile Duployé.

Many words from Chinook Jargon remain in common use in the Western United States and British Columbia, and it has been described as part of a multicultural heritage shared by the modern inhabitants of the Pacific Northwest. The total number of Jargon words in published lexicons numbered only in hundreds. It has its own grammatical system. It is  a very simple system, and like its word list, is easy to learn.

Name
Most books written in English still use the term Chinook Jargon, but some linguists working with the preservation of a creolized form of the language used in Grand Ronde, Oregon, prefer the term Chinuk Wawa (with the spelling 'Chinuk' instead of 'Chinook'). Historical speakers did not use the name Chinook Wawa, however, but rather "the Wawa" or "Lelang" (from Fr. , the language, or tongue). Wawa also means speech or words – "have a wawa" means "hold a parley" even in modern idiomatic English, and lelang also means the physical bodypart, the tongue.

The name for the Jargon varied throughout the territory in which it was used. For example: skokum hiyu in the Boston Bar-Lytton area of the Fraser Canyon, or in many areas simply just "the old trade language" or "the Hudson Bay language".

History

Origins
Whether Jargon was a post-contact or pre-contact language has been the subject of debate. In 2016 linguist John Lyon studied  the word lists collected by Francis Drake and his crew on the 1579 voyage that took them to the Oregon coast. Lyon compared the seven words and phrases found on the Native vocabulary list recorded by Drake and his men, with vocabularies of Native languages on the west coast (Lyon 2016). Out of the five single words on the list, Lyon found interesting sound and meaning matches in the vocabulary list for three Jargon words. One of the words was the word petáh which was the Native word for a root that can be eaten raw or made into cakes called cheepe. Lyon thought these were good sound and meaning matches for the Jargon words 'wapato' (a root that tastes like a potato) and 'chaplill' which is the word for the bread cakes made from this root (Lyon 2016:41). The word recorded for ‘king’ by Drake was 'hióh' (recorded also as 'hioghe'). Lyon though was a good sound match for the Wawa word hi-yú, meaning a gathering, or much, plenty. Though Lyon was not able to conclude Drake encountered people of the Northwest Coast, in 2021 Melissa Darby studied the ethnographic records and the records left by Francis Drake's expedition, and found new evidence that the people Drake met were speaking some Jargon words to Drake and his men.

The pre-contact hypothesis states that the language developed prior to European settlement as an intra-indigenous contact language in a region marked by divisive geography and intense linguistic diversity, eventually expanding to incorporate elements of European languages, with approximately 15 percent of its lexicon derived from French. The Jargon also acquired English loanwords and its written form is entirely in the Duployan Shorthand created by French priest Émile Duployé.

The post-contact hypothesis suggests it originated in Nootka Sound after the arrival of Russian and Spanish traders as a means of communicating between them and indigenous peoples, eventually spreading further south due to commercial use. University of Ottawa linguist David Lang has argued for this understanding.

Linguist Barbara Harris suggests a dual genesis, positing that both origins probably have some legitimacy and the two varieties eventually blended together.

By 1840, it had creolized into a native language for some speakers.

Use

In the Diocese of Kamloops, British Columbia, hundreds of speakers also learned to read and write the Jargon using Duployan shorthand via the publication Kamloops Wawa.  As a result, the Jargon also had the beginnings of its own literature, mostly translated scripture and classical works, and some local and episcopal news, community gossip and events, and diaries. Novelist and early Native American activist Marah Ellis Ryan (c. 1860–1934) used Chinook words and phrases in her writing.

In Oregon, Chinook Jargon was widely used by Natives, trappers, traders, employees of the Hudson's Bay Company, missionaries, and pioneers who came across the Oregon Trail from the 1830s to 1870s. In Portland's first half century (1840s–1890s) there were frequent trade interactions between pioneers and Native Americans. After about 1900, when such daily interactions were less frequent, Jargon was spoken among pioneer families to prove how early they arrived out west. Many Oregonians used Jargon in casual conversation—to add humor, whimsy or emphasis and to exhibit deep knowledge of Oregon's history. Though traditions of speaking Jargon faded away among the non-Native population, some of Oregon's tribal groups continued speaking Chinook Jargon, though usage was diminished.

According to Nard Jones, Chinook Jargon was still in use in Seattle until roughly the eve of World War II, especially among the members of the Arctic Club, making Seattle the last city where the language was widely used. Writing in 1972, he remarked that at that later date "Only a few can speak it fully, men of ninety or a hundred years old, like Henry Broderick, the realtor, and Joshua Green, the banker."

Jones estimates that in pioneer times in the 1860s there were about 100,000 speakers of Chinook Jargon. The language was being used, even entire paragraphs, without translations in local newspapers from at least Oregon and Washington states. It was also used by teachers to teach natives at school, by shopkeepers to sell things, by courts as an interview tool or to judge if a person was a citizen or not, by priests to teach religion, and between children playing on the street.

It peaked in usage from approximately 1858 to 1900, and declined as a result of the Spanish flu and World War I.

In the 20th century, Chinook Jargon entered a slow decline. As late as the 1940s, native speakers were still being born in Tiller, Oregon, but by 1962 the Summer Institute of Linguistics (SIL) estimated that only 100 speakers were left. In the 2000s, Lane Community College in Eugene, Oregon, started a three-semester university program teaching Chinook Jargon The 2010 United States Census recorded 640 native speakers.

Evolution

There is some controversy about the origin of the Jargon, but the consensus is that the pidgin peaked in use during the 19th century. During this era, many dictionaries were published to help settlers interact with the First Nations people living in the Pacific Northwest. Local settler families exchanged communiqués that were stylishly composed entirely in "the Chinook." Many residents of the British Columbia city of Vancouver spoke Chinook Jargon as their first language, even using it at home in preference to English. Among the first Europeans to use Chinook Jargon were traders, trappers, voyageurs, coureurs des bois, and Catholic missionaries.

The original Jargon was a pidgin, originally used as a second language by speakers of other Native American languages in the area. It had sentence-initial negation, which is atypical of regional languages, and also didn't have typical complex morphology. It had SVO structure, while Chinookan languages and Salishan languages were VSO. However, local Athabaskan languages were SOV, so this was probably a result of contact — a cross-language compromise. Only later did Chinook Jargon acquire significant English and French lexical items.

The Jargon is influenced by individuals' accents and terms from their native languages; as Kanakas married into First Nations and non-native families, their particular mode of the Jargon is believed to have contained Hawaiian words or Hawaiian styles of pronunciation. In some areas, the adoption of further non-aboriginal words has been observed. Chinook Jargon naturally became the first language in multiracial households and in multiethnic work environments such as canneries and logging camps and ranches, where it remained the language of the workplace well into the middle of the 20th century. During the Gold Rush, Chinook Jargon was used in British Columbia at first by gold prospectors and Royal Engineers; then as industry developed, Chinook Jargon was often used by cannery workers, hop pickers, loggers, fishermen, and ranchers of diverse ethnic backgrounds. It is possible that, at one point, the population of British Columbia spoke Chinook Jargon more than any other language, even English. Historian Jane Barman wrote,

A heavily creolized form of Chinook Jargon (Chinuk Wawa) is still spoken as a first language by some residents of Oregon, much as the Métis language Michif is spoken in Canada. Hence, Chinuk Wawa as it is known in Oregon is now a creole language, distinct from the widespread and widely varied pronunciation of the Chinook Jargon as it spread beyond the Chinookan homeland. There is evidence that in some communities (e.g., around Fort Vancouver) the Jargon had become creolized by the early 19th century and that would have been among the mixed French/Métis, Algonkian, Scots and Hawaiian population there as well as among the natives around the Fort. At Grand Ronde, the resettlement of tribes from all over Oregon in a multi-tribal agency led to the use of Chinuk Wawa as a common tongue among the linguistically diverse population. These circumstances led to the creolization of Chinuk Wawa at Grand Ronde. There is also evidence that creolization occurred at the Confederated Tribes of Siletz reservation paralleling Grand Ronde although, due to language revitalization efforts being focused on the Tolowa language, Chinuk fell out of use.

No studies of British Columbia versions of the Jargon have demonstrated creolization. The range of varying usages and vocabulary in different regions suggests that localization did occur—although not on the pattern of Grand Ronde where Wasco, Klickitat and other peoples adopted and added to the version of the Jargon that developed there. First-language speakers of the Chinook Jargon were common in BC (native and non-native), until the mid-20th century. It is a truism that while after 1850 the Wawa was mostly a native language in the United States portion of the Chinook-speaking world, it remained in wide use among non-natives north of the border for another century, especially in wilderness areas and work environments. Local creolizations probably did occur in British Columbia, but recorded materials have not been studied as they were made due to the focus on the traditional aboriginal languages.

Many believe that something similar to the Jargon existed before European contact—without European words in its vocabulary. There is some evidence for a Chinookan-Nuu-chah-nulth lingua franca in the writings of John Jewitt and in what is known as the Barclay Sound word-list, from the area of Ucluelet and Alberni. Others believe that the Jargon was formed in the great cultural cauldron of the time of Contact and cannot be discussed separately from that context, with an appreciation for the full range of the Jargon-speaking community and its history.

Current scholarly opinion holds that a trade language probably existed before European contact, which began "morphing" into the more familiar Chinook Jargon in the late 1790s, notably at a dinner party at Nootka Sound where Capts Vancouver and Bodega y Quadra were entertained by Chief Maquinna and his brother Callicum performing a theatrical using mock English and mock Spanish words and mimicry of European dress and mannerisms. There evidently was a Jargon in use in the Queen Charlotte, but this "Haida Jargon" is not known to have shared anything in common with Chinook Jargon, or with the Nooktan-Chinookan "proto-jargon" which is its main foundation.

Orthographies
There are a few main spelling variations of Chinook Jargon but each individual writer also had their own spelling variations.

1. English, French and German-Based Spelling
In a general sense, when words derived from English or French the original English/French spellings were used. Words not derived from English/French were written in an approximate spelling based on mainstream English, French or German spelling. This would mean, for example, "kloochman" (from Nootka łuucmaa) for "woman, wife", "house" (English origin) for "house", and "le clou" (French origin) for "nail, claw". This spelling doesn't take into account the actual mainstream pronunciation of the words in Chinook Jargon.
2. Approximate Sound-Based Spelling
With every writer having their own variation of a fairly standardized spelling based on their own dialect, the same examples above could be "tlotchmin, haws, leklo".
3. IPA-based spelling for use on smartphones and early computers
This was used on the Chinook Jargon Listserve in the 1990s and other places where it was/is difficult or impossible to type using actual IPA symbols. Compare X-SAMPA, another ASCII transcription of IPA.
4. IPA-based Grand Ronde Spelling
This is only used by speakers of the Grand Ronde dialect in Oregon.

Below is a comparison chart.

Jargon Chinook Alphabet (Grande Ronde):

Contemporary status

Linguist David Douglas Robertson and others have described Chinook Jargon as part of a shared cultural heritage of modern inhabitants of the Pacific Northwest.

Pacific Northwest historians are well acquainted with the Chinook Jargon, in name if not in the ability to understand it.  Mentions of and phrases of Chinook Jargon were found in nearly every piece of historical source material before 1900.  Chinook Jargon is relatively unknown to the rest of the population, perhaps due to the great influx of newcomers into the influential urban areas. However, the memory of this language is not likely to fade entirely. Many words are still used and enjoyed throughout Oregon, Washington, British Columbia, the Yukon, and Alaska. Old-timers still dimly remember it, although in their youth, speaking this language was discouraged as slang.  Nonetheless, it was the working language in many towns and workplaces, notably in ranching country and in canneries on the British Columbia Coast where it was necessary in the strongly multi-ethnic workforce.  Place names throughout this region bear Jargon names (see List of Chinook Jargon placenames) and words are preserved in various rural industries such as logging and fishing.

The Chinook Jargon was multicultural and functional.  To those familiar with it, Chinook Jargon is often considered a wonderful cultural inheritance. For this reason, and because Jargon has not quite died, enthusiasts actively promote the revival of the language in everyday western speech.

 the Confederated Tribes of the Grand Ronde Community of Oregon was taking steps to preserve Chinook Jargon use through a full immersion head start/preschool which is conducted in Chinuk Wawa, in hopes of fostering fluency in the language. The Confederated Tribes also offer Chinuk Wawa lessons at their offices in Eugene and Portland. In addition, Lane Community College offers two years of Chinuk Wawa study that satisfy second-language graduation requirements of Oregon public universities.

In March 2012, the tribe published a Chinuk Wawa dictionary through University of Washington Press.

At her swearing-in as lieutenant governor in 2001, Iona Campagnolo concluded her speech in Chinook, saying "" Chinook for "everyone was thrown together to make this strange new country [British Columbia]", lit. "All people go together they make this strange new land".

An art installation featuring Chinook Jargon, "Welcome to the Land of Light" by Henry Tsang, can be viewed on the Seawall along False Creek in downtown Vancouver, British Columbia, between Davie and Drake streets. Translation into Chinook Jargon was done by Duane Pasco.

A short film using Chinook Jargon, Small Pleasures by Karin Lee, explores intercultural dialogue between three women of different cultural and linguistic backgrounds in 1890s Barkerville in northern British Columbia.

Revitalization at Grand Ronde 
In 1997, the Grand Ronde reservation in Northern Oregon hired Tony Johnson, a Chinook linguist, to head its language program.  Chinuk Wawa was chosen due to its strong connection to native identity on the reservation as well as being the only indigenous language still spoken at Grand Ronde.  Prior to this, there were formal Chinuk Wawa classes taught by Eula Holmes from 1978 until her death in 1986. Eula Holmes' sister, Ila, held informal and sporadic classes to teach the language to the public. Henry Zenk was brought onto the project in 1998 after having previous experience with the language, documenting it in the late 1970s to early 1980s.  Community classes were started in the summer of 1998 and a dictionary was released in 2012.  This dictionary was compiled from the Chinuk Wawa of Grand Ronde elders, chiefly from the Hudson, Wacheno and Riggs families.  The dictionary features a section on Chinuk Wawa recorded from natives of the lower Columbia, but not used by the elders at Grand Ronde. In 2014, the tribe made an app spanning traditional to modern vocabulary.

In 2001 with funding from the Administration for Native Americans, the tribe started an immersion preschool.  A kindergarten was started in 2004 by Kathy Cole, a tribal member and certified teacher, which has since expanded to a half-day immersion K–4 with slots for 25 students for students at Willamina Elementary School.  Cole also started Chinuk Wawa elective classes at Willamina High School in 2011. Students there and at Willamina Middle School can earn high school and college credit for completion of the course.  Lane Community College also teaches a two-year course of Chinuk Wawa.

The online magazine Kaltash Wawa was founded in November 2020 using BC Chinuk Wawa and written in Chinuk Pipa, the alphabet based on Dupoyan shorthand.

Influence on English
British Columbian English and Pacific Northwest English have several words still in current use which are loanwords from the Chinook Jargon, which was widely spoken throughout the Pacific Northwest by all ethnicities well into the middle of the 20th century. These words tend to be shared with, but are not as common in, the states of Oregon, Washington, Alaska and, to a lesser degree, Idaho and western Montana.

Chinook Jargon words used by English-language speakers

 Cheechako — Newcomer; the word is formed from chee ("new") + chako ("come") and was used to refer to non-native people.
 Chuck — Water; and thus saltchuck "salt water". Colchuck Peak and Colchuck Glacier in the Alpine Lakes Wilderness take their name from Colchuck Lake, "cold water". The name of the Skookum-chuck river means "strong"-"water" (rapids).
 Cultus — means bad, worthless, useless, ordinary, evil or taboo. Cultus iktus means "worthless junk".
 Hiyu —  less common nowadays, but still heard in some places to mean a party or gathering.  From the Chinook for "many" or "several" or "lots of". The Big Hiyu (also known as "The July") was a week-long joint celebration of Dominion Day and the Glorious Fourth in the Fraser Canyon town of Lillooet, featuring horse races, gambling, a rodeo and other festivities. A tenas hiyu (small gathering) was on a much smaller scale. The community of West Seattle has celebrated the month of July for more than 75 years with the HiYu Summer Festival.
 Iktus — "stuff" in Chinook Jargon, also pronounced "itkus" with 't' and 'k' reversed.
 Klootchman or klootch — in the Jargon meaning simply "a woman" or the female of something – klootchman kiuatan (mare), klootchman lecosho (sow), tenas klootchman or klootchman tenas (girl, female child). Still in use in English in some areas and with people of an older background to mean a First Nations woman, or to refer to the wives/women attached to a certain group in a joking way e.g. "we sent all the klootchman to the kitchen while we played cards". Unlike its male equivalent siwash, klootchman does not generally have a derisive tone nowadays (when used).
 Masi  — In northern BC and the Yukon, and used in broadcast English in those areas, the Chinook Jargon adaption of the French  remains common, i.e. mahsi or masi, with the accent on the first syllable (unlike in French).
 It is possible that the slang term moolah, meaning money in American slang, comes from the Jargon word moolah meaning "mill" in Chinook (lumber mills were a source of wealth in the PNW).
 Mucky muck or muckamuck — in the Jargon means "plenty of food" and came to connote one who lived well, thus in colloquial English an important or officious person. Related to this is high muckety muck, or Chinook hyas muckamuck.
 Potlatch — in Chinook Jargon is a ceremony among certain tribes involving food and exchange of gifts, nowadays sometimes used to refer to a potluck dinner or sometimes the giving away of personal items to friends.
 Quiggly, quiggly hole — refers to the remains of an old Indian pit-house, or underground house, from kickwillie or kekuli, which in the Jargon means "down" or "underneath" or "beneath".
 Siwash — properly a First Nations man, but sometimes used for women as well.  The origins and meaning may be considered pejorative and derogatory French .  When pronounced  , with the rhythm of the original French, it is used by modern speakers of the Chinook Jargon in Grand Ronde, Oregon, with the context of meaning a Native American, or as an adjective connoting connection to same, such as in Siwash Rock or Siwash Sweaters. The  pronunciation is considered offensive in Grand Ronde.
 Skookum —  The most versatile is skookum, which was used in the Jargon either as a verb auxiliary for to be able or an adjective for able, strong, big, genuine, reliable – which sums up its use in BC English, although there are a wide range of possible usages: a skookum house is a jail or prison (house in the Jargon could mean anything from a building to a room).  "He's a skookum guy" means that the person is solid and reliable while "we need somebody who's skookum" means that a strong and large person is needed.  A carpenter, after banging a stud into place, might check it and decide, "Yeah, that's skookum".  Asking for affirmation, someone might say "is that skookum" or "is that skookum with you?"  Skookum can also be translated simply as "O.K." but it means something a bit more emphatic.
 Tenas — means "small".
 Tillicum — means "people/person", "family", and "people".
 Tolo —  used in Western Washington to mean a semi-formal dance, analogous to the homecoming ball, to which girls ask boys. From the Chinook for "to win".
 Tyee — leader, chief, boss.  Also Big Tyee in the context of "boss" or well-known person.  In Campbell River and in the sport-fishing business, a really big chinook salmon is a Tyee.  In the Jargon Tyee meant chief, and could also be an adjective denoting "big", as with tyee salmon or tyee lamel (boss mule). A hyas tyee means "important/big ruler/leader", i.e. – king, big boss, important ruler, and is also sometimes used in English in the same way as Big Tyee. e.g. "He was the undisputed hyas tyee of all the country between the Johnstone Strait and Comox" This was also the common title used for the famous chiefs of the early era, such as Maquinna, for whom it was applied by Captain Vancouver and others in the context of "king". The Hyas Klootchman Tyee – "Great Woman Ruler", roughly "Her Majesty", was the historical term for Queen Victoria.  The word tyee was commonly used and still occurs in some local English usages meaning "boss" or someone in charge. Business and local political and community figures of a certain stature from some areas are sometimes referred to in the British Columbia papers and histories by the old chiefly name worn by Maquinna, Concomly and Nicola. A man called hyas tyee would have been a senator, a longtime MP or MLA, or a business magnate with a strong local powerbase, long-time connections, and wealth from and because of the area. There is a popular BC news site named The Tyee. Beginning in 1900, Tyee was also the title of the University of Washington Yearbook.

Notable non-natives known to speak Chinook Jargon 

Francis Jones Barnard
Francis Stillman Barnard
Sir Matthew Baillie Begbie
Franz Boas
Sir James Douglas
Joshua Green
Phoebe Goodell Judson
Father Jean-Marie-Raphaël Le Jeune
Sir Richard McBride
Debbie McGee
John McLoughlin
Morley Roberts
Robert William Service
Sam Sullivan
Theodore Winthrop

See also
List of Chinook Jargon placenames
American Indian Pidgin English
Maritime fur trade
Medny Aleut language
Nootka Jargon
Tlingit noun
Wobbly lingo

References

External links

Note: The Incubator link at right will take you to the Chinuk Wawa test-Wikipedia, which is written in a variation of the standardized orthography of the Confederated Tribes of Grand Ronde which differs significantly from the orthographies used by early linguists and diarists recording other versions of the Jargon:
Portland State University Chinook Jargon Collection—dictionaries, books, & journal articles documenting the etymology, grammar, history, origins, and use of the Chinook Jargon trade language collected by Donald W. Bushaw.
Selected references for students and scholars—including study guides and four dictionaries
British Columbia Time Temple Archive Excellent resource compiling public domain texts written about and in the Chinook Wawa
Kamloops Wawa page, Chinook Jargon Information Superhighway site
Chinook Texts by Franz Boas
ntsayka ikanum (Our Story) Confederated Tribes of Grand Ronde Culture website—written and spoken examples of elder wawa from Grand Ronde as well as information on the history of the tribe and language.

Archives
Thomas Wickham Prosch papers. 1775–1915. 1 linear foot (3 boxes). Includes dictionary of Chinook jargon. At the University of Washington Libraries, Special Collections.

Free e-books

Charles Montgomery Tate. Chinook as spoken by the Indians of Washington Territory, British Columbia and Alaska for the use of traders, tourists and others who have business intercourse with the Indians : Chinook-English, English-Chinook. M.W. Waitt, Victoria, B.C. [1889?]

Dictionaries online 
Directory to on-line Jargon dictionaries
Abridged Chinook Dictionary
Chinook Jargon history, dictionary and phrasebook—includes annotated version of Shaw's dictionary, augmented by content from other word lists.

News and newsletters
Tenas Wawa—Archive of early 1990s newsletter about Chinook Jargon, also includes audio of a song in the Jargon.
Can We Still Speak Chinook? from B.C.'s The Tyee, January 2006

Other links
First People's Language Map: Chinuk Wawa
First People's Language Map: Chinuk Wawa Resources Resources

 
North America Native-based pidgins and creoles
Indigenous languages of the Pacific Northwest Coast
Indigenous languages of the North American Plateau
Culture of the Pacific Northwest
Extinct languages of North America
Oregon Country
Indigenous languages of Washington (state)
Indigenous languages of Oregon
Anglic languages
Métis culture
Hudson's Bay Company
History of the Pacific Northwest
Native American language revitalization
Languages attested from the 19th century
Languages of the United States
Languages of Canada